Golgin subfamily A member 3 is a protein that in humans is encoded by the GOLGA3 gene.

The Golgi apparatus, which participates in glycosylation and transport of proteins and lipids in the secretory pathway, consists of a series of stacked cisternae (flattened membrane sacs). Interactions between the Golgi and microtubules are thought to be important for the reorganization of the Golgi after it fragments during mitosis. 

This gene encodes a member of the golgin family of proteins which are localized to the Golgi. Its encoded protein has been postulated to play a role in nuclear transport and Golgi apparatus localization. Several alternatively spliced transcript variants of this gene have been described, but the full-length nature of these variants has not been determined.

References

Further reading